Sujith Vasudevan I (born 3 October 1969), professionally credited as Sharreth, is an Indian music director and singer. He predominantly composes film scores and songs for Malayalam films, but has gone on to compose for Tamil, Telugu and Hindi films too. He won the Filmfare Award for the best music director in 2008. He won the Kerala State Film Award for Best Music Director in 2011 for the film Ivan Megharoopan. He was also the first recipient of the Kerala State Film Award for Best Classical Music Singer for his song Bhavayami in the film Meghatheertham. He is the son in law of famous music director Kannur Rajan .

Early life
Born to Vasudevan Achari and Indiradevi in Kollam, Kerala, India, Sharreth is a protégé of carnatic music virtuoso M. Balamuralikrishna. He made his debut as a film composer in 1990 through the Malayalam language film Kshanakkathu. Prior to debuting as a composer, Sharreth had a sporadic presence as a playback singer for films. His first song was 'Dum dum dum', a duet with K. S. Chithra for the Malayalam film Onningu Vannengil (1985).

Career
He was one of the permanent judges of Idea Star Singer on Asianet till the end of the fifth season. From 26 September 2011, he has become a judge along with P. Jayachandran on the Amrita TV musical reality show Super Star – the Ultimate. From May 2012, he has become a judge along with Ouseppachan and S. P. Shylaja on the Kairali TV's Gandharava Sangeetham. From February 2013, he was a judge along with K. S. Chithra, Srinivas and Sujatha on the Mazhavil Manorama's singing reality show Indian Voice (season 2) and Indian Voice Junior. His memoir written by Sanjeev Pillai titled Aathmaraagam was published by Litmus Publications (an imprint of DC Books) in 2014. At present, he is one of the permanent judges of Star Singer hosted by Asianet from 2020, along with K .S Chithra, G. Venugopal, Stephen Devassy and Manjari.

Awards

 2011 – Kerala State Film Award for Best Music Director – Ivan Megharoopan
 2009 – Kerala State Film Award for Best Classical Music Singer – "Bhavayami" from Meghatheertham
 2008 – Filmfare Award for Best Music Director (Malayalam) – Thirakkatha
 2008 – Mullassery Raju Music Award – Thirakkatha

Discography

Film discography

Independent album discography

 Sangeetha Paravai (Tamil)
 Chitra Pournami (1994)
 Sarana Manthram (1994)
 Chaithra Geethangal (1997)
 Pasupathaasthram -Sree Kadampuzha Bhagavathi (1997)
 Gopeechandanam – Guruvayoorpuran Songs (1999)
 Onappoovu
 Gurudevan (2001)
 Veendum (2003)
 Sree Gananaatham (2008)
 Devapampa (2009)
 Sasthavu (2010)
 Strawberry Theyyam (2014)
 Njanappana (ART OF LIVING (2014)
 Pahimam Padmanabha (2015)
 Green Symphony (2015)
 Paavana Pamba (2016)

As singer

As dubbing artist

Television
All are Malayalam shows unless noted
As Judge

References

External links
 
 

Living people
Musicians from Kollam
Malayalam film score composers
Kerala State Film Award winners
Filmfare Awards South winners
1969 births
Film musicians from Kerala
Singers from Kollam
20th-century Indian composers
21st-century Indian composers
21st-century Indian singers
20th-century Indian singers
Indian male playback singers
Malayalam playback singers
Indian male film score composers
20th-century Indian male singers
21st-century Indian male singers